The term subitism points to sudden awakening, the idea that insight into Buddha-nature, or the nature of mind, is "sudden," c.q. "in one glance," "uncovered all together," or "together, completely, simultaneously," in contrast to "successively or being uncovered one after the other." It may be posited as opposite to gradualism, the original Buddhist approach which says that following the dharma can be achieved only step by step, through an arduous practice.

Etymology
The application of the term "subitism" to Buddhism is derived from the French illumination subite (sudden awakening), contrasting with 'illumination graduelle' (gradual awakening). It gained currency in this use in English from the work of sinologist Paul Demiéville. His 1947 work 'Mirror of the Mind' was widely read in the U.S. It inaugurated a series by him on subitism and gradualism.

The Chinese term tun, as used in tun-wu, translated as "subite," sudden, has a broader meaning than "sudden." It is more apt translated as "in one glance," "uncovered all together," or "together, completely, simultaneously," in contrast to "successively or being uncovered one after the other." It means that all aspects of Buddhist practice are realized, or actualized, simultaneously, and not one after another as in a gradual or linear school curriculum. Specifically, the defilements are not erased gradually, by good works, but simultaneously.

Subitizing, also derived from the Latin adjective subitus, is the rapid, accurate, and confident judgments of numbers performed for small numbers of items.

Dun wu in Chinese Buddhism

Chan
The distinction between sudden and gradual awakening has its roots in Indian Buddhism. It was first introduced in China in the beginning of the 5th century CE by Tao Sheng. The term became of central importance in Chan Buddhism, where it is used to denote the doctrinal position that awakening, the comprehension or realization of the Buddhist teachings, happens simultaneously, and is not the fruit of a gradual accretion or realisation.

Shenhui
In the 8th century the distinction became part of a struggle for influence at the Chinese court by Shenhui, a student of Huineng. Hereafter "sudden enlightenment" became one of the hallmarks of Chan Buddhism, though the sharp distinction was softened by subsequent generations of practitioners.

This softening is reflected in the Platform Sutra of Huineng.

Rivalry between schools
While the socalled "Southern School" was said to place emphasis on sudden enlightenment, it also marked a shift in doctrinal basis from the Laṅkāvatāra Sūtra to the prajnaparamita tradition, especially the Diamond Sutra. The Laṅkāvatāra Sūtra, which endorses the Buddha-nature, emphasized purity of mind, which can be attained in gradations. The Diamond Sutra emphasizes śūnyatā, which "must be realized totally or not at all".

Once this dichotomy was in place, it defined its own logic and rhetorics, which are also recognizable in the distinction between Caodong (Sōtō) and Linji (Rinzai) schools. But it also leads to a "sometimes bitter and always prolix sectarian controversy between later Ch'an and Hua-yen exegetes". In the Huayan classification of teachings, the sudden approach was regarded inferior to the Perfect Teaching of Huayan. Guifeng Zongmi, fifth patriarch of Huayan and Chan master, devised his own classification to counter this subordination. To establish the superiority of Chan, Jinul, the most important figure in the formation of Korean Seon, explained the sudden approach as not pointing to mere emptiness, but to suchness or the dharmadhatu.

Later re-interpretations
Guifeng Zongmi, fifth-generation successor to Shenhui, also softened the edge between sudden and gradual. In his analysis, sudden awakening points to seeing into one's true nature, but is to be followed by a gradual cultivation to attain buddhahood.

This gradual cultivation is also recognized by Dongshan Liangjie, who described the Five Ranks of enlightenment. Other example of depiction of stages on the path are the Ten Bulls, which detail the steps on the Path, The Three Mysterious Gates of Linji, and the Four Ways of Knowing of Hakuin Ekaku. This gradual cultivation is described by Chan Master Sheng Yen as follows:

Hua-yen
In the Fivefold Classification of the Huayan school and the Five Periods and Eight Teachings of the Tiantai-school the sudden teaching was given a high place, but still inferior to the Complete or Perfect teachings of these schools.

Pure Land
Shandao clarified that Pure Land Dharma is sudden. Honen explained it as “the sudden of the sudden (頓中頓) teachings”. Shinran classified it as Sudden Crosswise (vs. Lengthwise) Transcendence via Easy (vs. Difficult) Practice.

Dzogchen
Dzogchen (The Great Perfection), aka Ati-Yoga, is a Tibetan sudden-enlightenment tradition.

Korean Seon
Chinul, a 12th-century Korean Seon master, followed Zongmi, and also emphasized that insight into our true nature is sudden, but is to be followed by practice to ripen the insight and attain full Buddhahood.

In contemporary Korean Seon, Seongcheol has defended the stance of "sudden insight, sudden cultivation". Citing Taego Bou (太古普愚: 1301-1382) as the true successor of the Linji Yixuan (臨済義玄) line of patriarchs rather than Jinul (知訥: 1158-1210), he advocated Hui Neng's original stance of 'sudden enlightenment, sudden cultivation' (Hangul: 돈오돈수, Hanja: 頓悟頓修) as opposed to Jinul's stance of 'sudden enlightenment, gradual cultivation' (Hangul: 돈오점수, Hanja: 頓悟漸修). Whereas Jinul had initially asserted that with enlightenment comes the need to further one's practice by gradually destroying the karmic vestiges attained through millions of rebirths, Huineng and Seongcheol maintained that with perfect enlightenment, all karmic remnants disappear and one becomes a Buddha immediately.

Popularisation in the west

When Zen was introduced in the west, the Rinzai stories of unconventional masters and sudden enlightenment caught the popular imagination. D. T. Suzuki was a seminal influence in this regard. It was Suzuki's contention that a Zen satori (awakening) was the goal of the tradition's training. As Suzuki portrayed it, Zen Buddhism was a highly practical religion whose emphasis on direct experience made it particularly comparable to forms of mystical experience that scholars such as William James had emphasized as the fountainhead of all religious sentiment.

Indian spirituality
The emphasis on direct experience is also recognized in forms of Indian spirituality, which gained popularity in the west in 1960s and 1970s, and further influenced the discourse on awakening in the west.

Advaita Vedanta - Shankara

The Advaita tradition emphasizes that, since Brahman is ever-present, Brahman-knowledge is immediate and requires no 'action', that is, striving and effort, as articulated by Shankara; yet, it also prescribes elaborate preparatory practice, including yogic samadhi and contemplation on the mahavakyas, posing a paradox which is also recognized in other spiritual disciplines and traditions.

Classical Advaita Vedānta regards the liberated state of being Atman-Brahman as one's true identity and inherent to being human. No human action can 'produce' this liberated state, as it is what one already is. As Swami Vivekananda stated:

Yet, it also emphasizes human effort, the path of Jnana Yoga, a progression of study and training to realize one's true identity as Atman-Brahman and attain moksha. Whereas neo-Advaita emphasizes direct insight, traditional Advaita Vedanta entails more than self-inquiry or bare insight into one's real nature, but also includes self-restraint, textual studies and ethical perfection. It is described in classical Advaita books like Shankara's Upadesasahasri and the Vivekachudamani, which is also attributed to Shankara. 

Sruti (scriptures), proper reasoning and meditation are the main sources of knowledge (vidya) for the Advaita Vedānta tradition. It teaches that correct knowledge of Atman and Brahman is achievable by svādhyāya, study of the self and of the Vedic texts, and three stages of practice: sravana (perception, hearing), manana (thinking) and nididhyasana (meditation), a three-step methodology that is rooted in the teachings of chapter 4 of the Brihadaranyaka Upanishad.

Shankara regarded the srutis as the means of knowledge of Brahman, and he was ambivalent about yogic practices and meditation, which at best may prepare one for Brahma-jnana. According to Rambacharan, criticising Vivekananda's presentation of yoga and samadhi as an Advaitic means of knowledge, Shankara states that the knowledge of Brahman can only be obtained from inquiry of the Shruti, and not by Yoga or samadhi, which at best can only silence the mind.

Ramana Maharshi - Akrama mukti

Ramana Maharshi made a distinction between akrama mukti, "sudden liberation", as opposed to the krama mukti, "gradual liberation" as in the Vedanta path of jnana yoga:{{refn|group=note|Rama P. Coomaraswamy: "[Krama-mukti is] to be distinguished from jîvan-mukti, the state of total and immediate liberation attained during this lifetime, and videha-mukti, the state of total liberation attained at the moment of death." See <ref group=web>[http://www.swami-krishnananda.org/realis/realis_6a.html Swami Krishnananda, The Attainment of Liberation: Progressive Salvation]</ref> for more info on "gradual liberation".}}

Inchegeri Sampradaya - "the Ant's way"
The teachings of Bhausaheb Maharaj, the founder of the Inchegeri Sampradaya, have been called "the Ant's way",  the way of meditation, while the teachings of Siddharameshwar Maharaj, his disciples Nisargadatta Maharaj and Ranjit Maharaj and Nisargadatta's disciple, Ramakant Maharaj have been called "the Bird's Way", the direct path to Self-discovery:

The terms appear in the Varaha Upanishad, Chapter IV:

See also
 Enlightenment in Buddhism
 Enlightenment (spiritual)
 Jinul
 Mushi-dokugo ("self-enlightenment")
 Subitizing
 Shattari
 Illuminationism

Notes

References

Sources

Printed sources

 
 
 
 
 
 
 
 
 
 
 
 
 
  
 
 
 
 
 
 
 
 
 
 
 
 
 
 
 
 
 
 
 
 
 
 
 

Web-sources

Further reading
General
 
Early Buddhism
 
Chan
 Faure, Bernard (1991), The Rhetoric of Immediacy. A Cultural Critique of Chan/Zen Buddhism. Princeton, New Jersey: Princeton University Press. 
 Peter N. Gregory (editor)(1991), Sudden and Gradual. Approaches to Enlightenment in Chinese Thought. Delhi: Motilal Banarsidass Publishers
 McRae, John (2003), Seeing through Zen. Encounter, Transformation, and Genealogy in Chinese Chan Buddhism''. The University Press Group Ltd .

External links
 Gary L. Ray, The Northern Ch'an School And Sudden Versus Gradual Enlightenment Debates In China And Tibet
 Wei Chueh, Gradual Cultivation And Sudden Enlightenment

Zen
Nondualism
Buddhist mysticism